Nattachai Srisuwan (born February 3, 1995) is a Thai professional footballer who plays as a midfielder for Thai League 2 club Chiangmai United.

References

External links

1995 births
Living people
Nattachai Srisuwan
Association football midfielders
Nattachai Srisuwan
Nattachai Srisuwan
Nattachai Srisuwan
Nattachai Srisuwan